Glücksgefühle is the fourth studio album by Swiss recording artist Beatrice Egli. It was released by Polydor and Island Records on 17 May 2013 in German-speaking Europe, following her win of the tenth season of Deutschland sucht den Superstar in 2013.

Track listing
All tracks written by Oliver Lucas and Dieter Bohlen; and produced by Bohlen.

Charts

Weekly charts

Year-end charts

Certifications

References 

2013 albums
Beatrice Egli albums